Scrinium brazieri is a species of sea snail, a marine gastropod mollusk in the family Mitromorphidae.

Description

Distribution
This marine species is endemic to Australia and occurs off New South Wales and South Australia

References

 Smith, E.A. (1891c) Descriptions of new species of shells from New South Wales, New Guinea, the Caroline and Soloman Islands. Proceedings of the Zoological Society of London, 1891, 486–491, pl. 40
 Hedley, C. 1918. A checklist of the marine fauna of New South Wales. Part 1. Journal and Proceedings of the Royal Society of New South Wales 51: M1–M120
 Laseron, C. 1954. Revision of the New South Wales Turridae (Mollusca). Australian Zoological Handbook. Sydney : Royal Zoological Society of New South Wales pp. 56, pls 1–12.
 Powell, A.W.B. 1966. The molluscan families Speightiidae and Turridae, an evaluation of the valid taxa, both Recent and fossil, with list of characteristic species. Bulletin of the Auckland Institute and Museum. Auckland, New Zealand 5: 1–184, pls 1–23
 Shuto, T. 1975. Notes on type species of some turrid genera based on the type specimens in the British Museum (N.H.). Venus 33(4): 161–175

External links
  Hedley, C. 1922. A revision of the Australian Turridae. Records of the Australian Museum 13(6): 213–359, pls 42–56  
 
 Biolib.cz: Scrinium brazieri

brazieri
Gastropods described in 1892
Gastropods of Australia